The 2013–14 season was the 111th in the history of the Southern League, which is an English football competition featuring semi-professional and amateur clubs from the South West, South Central and Midlands of England and South Wales. From the 2013–14 season onwards, the Southern League is known as The Calor Gas League Southern, following a sponsorship deal with Calor Gas.

Following the liquidation of Premier Division club Hinckley United and the resignation of Thatcham Town from Division One South & West at the end of the season, plus the resignation of Vauxhall Motors from the Conference North, Fleet Town were reprieved from relegation in Division One South & West.

Premier Division
The Premier Division expanded up to 24 clubs and consisted of 17 clubs from the previous season and seven new clubs:
Two clubs promoted from Division One Central:
Biggleswade Town
Burnham

Two clubs promoted from Division One South & West:
Hungerford Town
Poole Town

Two clubs relegated from the Conference North
Corby Town
Hinckley United

Plus:
Truro City, relegated from the Conference South

League table

Play-offs

Semi-finals

Final

Results

Stadia and locations

Division One Central
Division One Central consisted of 22 clubs, including 15 clubs from previous season and seven new clubs:
Aylesbury United, promoted from the Spartan South Midlands League
Dunstable Town, promoted from the Spartan South Midlands League
Egham Town, promoted from the Combined Counties League
Kettering Town, relegated from the Premier Division
Marlow, promoted from the Hellenic League
Potters Bar Town, transferred from Isthmian League Division One North 
St Ives Town, promoted from the United Counties League

League table

Play-offs

Semi-finals

Final

Results

Stadia and locations

Division One South & West
Division One South & West consisted of 22 clubs, including 17 clubs from previous season and five new clubs:
Four clubs transferred from Division One Central:
Fleet Town
Godalming Town
Guildford City
Thatcham Town
Plus:
Stratford Town, promoted from the Midland Alliance

League table

Play-offs

Semi-finals

Final

Results

Stadia and locations

League Cup

The Southern League Cup 2013–14 (billed as the RedInsure Cup 2013–14 for sponsorship reasons) is the 76th season of the Southern League Cup , the cup competition of the Southern Football League.

Preliminary round

First round

Second round

Third round

Quarter finals

Semi-finals

Final

First leg

Second leg

See also
 Southern Football League
 2013–14 Isthmian League
 2013–14 Northern Premier League

References

External links
Official website

2013-14
7